is a Japanese manga series written and illustrated by Masahiro Itosugi. It was first published in September 2007 by Akita Shoten. It started serialization in the ninth volume and was concluded in Volume 25 of Akita Shoten's seinen manga magazine Champion Red Ichigo. An OVA adaptation by Hoods Entertainment was released with the third volume of the manga on December 17, 2008. A second OVA adaptation, called  was released by Pony Canyon in two parts; the first part released on July 30, 2009, and the second part released on November 17, 2009. In April 2011, Itosugi announced that there will be no more printings of volumes 1 and 3 due to Bill 156.

Plot
Ever since he was a young child, Sora Aoi had always exchanged words of "I love you" with his attractive older sister Aki. Now, as he comes of age, he finds it much harder to exchange such comforts as they did in those simpler times. When Aki demonstrates her feelings toward him to go beyond a sister's love, Sora finds himself questioning his feelings for his sister. Realizing their affection for one another, they consummate their love in secret. In a society that would never understand, they must now keep their love a secret from their family and everyone they know. However, Sora soon finds himself exploring many forms of love with different kinds of women he met that is not accepted by society thus questioning his feelings for his sister.

Characters

Aoi family

His first name is written as 蒼空 (Sora) in kanji. He studies in the same high school as his older sisters, Aki and Nami. Unlike his sisters, he is good at cooking and housework. Sora has a low alcohol tolerance, as he falls unconscious by drinking even a little sake. 
Due to his upbringing without a father or any male figure in the household, as well as questionably awkward relationships with his sisters, Sora was raised with virtually no sexual experience of any kind. Almost all of his postures, behavior, and mannerisms are those typically expected from a shy person. His effeminate appearance makes him a perfect candidate for being taken advantaged of, which he finds himself engaging in involuntarily because of Nami's fetish and Runa's belief that he enjoys it. He is very shy and very much a pushover, and completely lacks the will to stand up for himself against girls, which further allows him to be forced to be sexually approached. Indeed very much every girl around him is immediately privileged with the opportunity to seduce him, which some of them did or attempted to undeterred by his discomfort and protests.
He is deeply in love with Aki, and does not resist her the second time she tries to have sex with him, but he does question himself at times whether their incest taboo should be continued, since they have no future in a relationship. He has also had sexual relationships with other people, such as Kana, Runa and Nami, though with the latter two he was forced. After witnessing Nana being molested by Nami, who threatened her with death if anything about the molest should ever be brought to light, he became terrified of her, but claimed that he does not hate her. They eventually rekindle their relationship when Nami asked for consensual sex, and had since then became more close. In the final chapters, Sora fully accepts his relationship with Aki, even defending it against their father. When Sora is taken away by their father, Aki is lonely and wants to see him again. After Sora chooses to go away so that Aki would not be hurt by their love, Aki is heartbroken and realizes that she truly loves Sora and wants to be with him. In the final chapter, they meet at their mother's grave.

Aki is Sora's elder sister. Her first name is written as 亜希 (Aki) in kanji. Attractive, athletic, and intelligent, she’s considered a model student at school and is highly popular. However, at home, she has no culinary talents and fails to keep her own room clean. She is deeply in love with Sora. She first attempts to have sex with Sora in the shower, but is unsuccessful, as Sora runs out of the bath in embarrassment. However, her second attempt, in his room, is successful, after which she gives him a heart-felt confession of her love towards him. After that, they engage in sexual intercourse many times, including in public places, such as the school gym's storage locker, an onsen, and on top of a ferris wheel. During these times, she does not want Sora to call her nēsan (elder sister), but Sora feels weird saying her name. She seems to be unaware that he has had sex with other women, other than herself. Sora's grades drop as a result of the distraction of his relationship with his sister. In response to this Aki refuses to have sex with him until his grades improve, and she cries at the thought of her flirting being the reason that Sora is doing poorly at school. After noticing how close Sora and Nami seem to be, Aki takes him out-of-town to spend some time together alone. However, on the train there, Sora seems to reject her advances. When she tries to seduce him again at the park, they almost get caught. Ultimately, they rekindle their romance in a love hotel. However, after their father's death, Sora decides that they should end their relationship so that Aki does not get hurt any further and says goodbye to her. They later meet up at their mother's grave.

Nami is Sora's middle sister whose features are almost completely identical to his (though in the anime her eye color is red, while Sora's eyes are brown; also, her hair is slightly darker than Sora's). Due to their similar appearance, Nami ties her hair in pigtails. Her hair is slightly longer than Sora's when let down and this is the only noticeable physical difference between them. Like Sora, Nami has a low tolerance to alcohol. 
When they were children, she'd often pretend to act like Sora, but as they grew up, it became apparent that their personalities are polar opposites. Unlike the quiet and well-behaved Sora, Nami is blunt and can be incredibly stubborn and harsh, and also quite eerie towards her little brother. For instance, she had a habit of seducing him when they were children out of jealousy, and often forces Sora to cosplay for her own amusement. She has a very strong disregard for Sora's feelings, demonstrated by how she deceived him into signing up for the cosplay club, despite his clear discomfort, and upon receiving his resignation letter, she immediately tore it up in front of him without consideration.
She's friends with her classmate Kana, though the latter is completely oblivious of the fact. In spite of this, she's actively trying to get Kana and Sora together. These efforts, culminating with her bearing witness to Sora and Kana having sex together, backfire on her and drove her into a dangerously precarious state of mind. Guided by the belief that her being a female and thus lacking a penis is what keeps her and Sora separated she assaults Kana in a fit of psychotic rage and, after almost slitting her throat with a pair of scissors, she proceeds to try and harm her, fantasizing during the whole act that she is making love to Sora. She obtains her silence through a death threat, and since then Nami has repeatedly had sex with Sora, rekindling their relationship and becoming more intimate. While vocally expressing her disgust at the act, she is becoming more obsessed with it, especially right after he has sex with Kana, craving her scent. It is unknown if she herself is attracted to Sora, or having sex with him is a way to vent her frustration. She is, however, apparently regretful of what she has done to her little brother, though this, coupled with their unhealthy relationship, is gnawing more and more at her already unbalanced psyche. Despite this, Aki has noted since then that they have become much closer to each other. Nami's relationship with Sora is later discovered by Kana, and the three end up having sex together, during which Nami's feelings towards Kana are finally revealed.

Aoi family mother 

The as-yet-unnamed mother of the Aoi family, who is actually Aki, Sora, and Nami's mother's younger sister (to be precise, their maternal aunt), but ever since her older sister — the kids' real mother — was killed in a traffic accident ten years ago, she has taken over the role as mother. She took over the role of their mother, and did not tell the siblings that their real mother died. She is usually busy working to support the family, and is not there for them, leading them to learn to live for themselves. She is also somewhat irresponsible, giving Nami some sake, when she is clearly underage, and appears somehow aloof and indifferent, something that puzzled Sora more than once. There is a running gag where she is unable to tell Nami and Sora apart, even when they are naked. Every day, she thinks about whether she should live the role as a false mother, and thought of telling Sora and Nami the truth. Sora himself is starting to question her identity, as she often forgets or is even oblivious of things easily identified by their late mother. Nevertheless, after being questioned about it by Sora, she even went so far as to procure herself a scar on an arm so as to mimic the one her late sister had, much to Aki's regret.

Aoi family mother
The real unnamed mother of the three Aoi children, she died ten years ago, when she was hit by a car while returning home from shopping. Her role as mother was taken over by her younger sister, and only Aki knows about it. When she first gave birth to Aki, she felt the body was surprisingly light, and offered her sister a chance to hold the baby. She sustained a scar during one Christmas in a cooking accident, in which her left arm was burned while saving Sora from falling. Eventually, Sora came to know her death, when he visited her grave at the end.

Aoi family father
The unnamed father of the three Aoi children, who makes his appearance in Chapter 26. He is a big man with dark hair like Aki and is very scary-looking. He walked out on the family when the Aoi children were very young, hence why Aki and Nami do not want anything to do with him. He returns to take Sora to live with him. He caught Aki and Sora when they were making love and punished Aki for it. He eventually dies in a hospital from an unknown illness.

Classmates

Kana is Sora's classmate and best friend. Kana and Nami are the only members of the cosplay club. She has feelings for Sora but is too shy to confess them. She is unaware of Nami's feelings towards her. Even when Nami stated she loved her, Kana believed it meant because they were friends. After a date, at which Kana gave Sora a kiss and performed oral sex on him, Nami, who was witnessing from a cupboard, snapped, leading to her molesting Kana. After some persuasion from Nami later, Kana loses her virginity to Sora, which Nami secretly records. It is vaguely expressed that Kana loved Sora after this, as Kana remembers the first time she had met with Sora, and believed it was fate, because she had the chance to love a boy who she liked. She later stumbles upon Sora and Nami's affair and joins them in three way, where Nami's feelings for Kana are eventually revealed.

Runa is Sora's senior at school. Ever since being forced to walk home from school only wearing her school swimsuit, she's been an exhibitionist. Sora first meets her as she was changing bare in the elevator at their apartment complex. She mistakenly thinks Sora finds this exciting. She later forces Sora on a "fetish" date with her. She is wearing only lingerie, and forces him to make out with her. Later, she tricks Sora into going to a sex orgy with her, as her boyfriend. She loses her virginity as Sora watches; they held hands through random partners. During the summer break, she takes him to the pool, where she pleasures Sora for helping with her exhibitionism again. It is unknown whether she has any feelings for Sora, however she has stated that it is only good if he is the one to see her naked. Because of this she has not returned to the "party", even though asked many times. In the autumn, Runa returns as a nude art model for the art club.

Natsumi is Sora's classmate. She attended the party that Hitomi had, and was one of the many girls to have set eyes on having sex with Sora. She felt a little annoyed when Sora had difficulty at remembering her at first sight at the party. She expressed slight resentment when she heard rumors from Nami that Sora and Kana were going out.

Alice is Aki's classmate. She is a beautiful girl with blond hair, girlfriend of Miharu Mihara, the school's student council president and self-proclaimed rival of Aki. As Alice is second place in the test results (under Aki), she tends to act distastefully towards Aki. Aki, however, is oblivious to this rivalry and considers themselves as friends, much to Alice's irritation. Due to this rivalry, when Miharu asked Sora to have sex with Alice to satisfy her in his (Miharu's) place, Alice was skeptical due to Sora being Aki's brother. Regardless, Alice loved Miharu dearly, and agreed to have sex with Sora, and even giving up her virginity to him. Later, all three play a game, in which Alice makes out with Sora while Miharu watches.

Yuna is the president of the school's art club. She agreed to let Runa take over as a substitute for the nude model in class, but noticed that the boys were looking at her more than drawing, and got angry at it. However, Runa correctly guessed that Yuna was aroused by the atmosphere. Runa later encourages her to have sex with Sora in order to overcome her embarrassment around nude males.

Others

Hitomi is Runa's friend. She held the orgy party that Runa tricked Sora into going, and had her sight set on Sora at the party's start. She was the first one to have sex with Sora at the party, and her boyfriend was the one who took Runa's virginity. After this party, Hitomi invited Runa to return many times, but because Runa only felt good with Sora, she did not return.

Miharu is Sora's childhood friend who used to live in the same apartment complex with the Aoi family. He is younger than Sora, and Sora addresses him as "Mi-chan", and would view him as a younger brother, were it not for Miharu's tendency to cross-dress as a girl. Miharu has an effeminate appearance, similar to Sora, but unlike Sora, he likes to cross-dress. He came to Sora's school in order to ask Sora to have sex with his girlfriend, Alice, because Miharu himself has erectile dysfunction, in order to make Alice happy. Miharu is shameless, as he not only cross-dresses and asks his friend to take away his girlfriend's virginity, but also narrates about Alice and Sora having sex with vulgar phrases. He got over his conditions only when witnessing Alice and Sora having sex. However, once Sora leaves and it was his turn,  Miharu became ED again. Therefore, he asks Sora to take care of Alice.

Kana's younger sister who appeared in Chapter 21 with their father to photograph Kana and Sora as wedding models. She hopes they will marry so that Nami can be her sister.

Media

Manga
The Aki Sora manga, written and drawn by Masahiro Itosugi, was serialized in Akita Shoten's Champion Red Ichigo magazine between September 5, 2008 and April 5, 2011. The individual chapters are collected and released by Akita Shoten in six bound volumes between December 19, 2008 and May 20, 2011. The first and third volumes were no longer printed following July 2011 due to the Tokyo Youth Development Ordinance bill due to its depictions of incest.

List of chapters

OVA
There are two OVA adaptations of Aki Sora, both produced by Hoods Entertainment, with Takeo Takahashi as director and storyboarder, Jukki Hanada as scriptwriter and Kazuya Kuroda as character designer and chief animation director. The first OVA was released with the third volume of the manga on December 18, 2009.

A second OVA adaptation, titled  was released by Pony Canyon in two parts and features a different voice cast from the first OVA. The first part was released on July 30, 2010 and the second part was released on November 17, 2010. Pony Canyon released a Blu-ray of both OVAs on September 19, 2013. The ending theme for this OVA is "Thx!" by Mai Kotouge. Media Blasters has licensed the second OVA under its Kitty imprint.

Episode list

Reception
Chris Beveridge commends the OVA for "good character designs, some good eroticism". He further comments, "While we get a fair bit of upper body nudity, there’s no genitalia involved for those that are looking for that aspect of it ... it’s not hiding the sex, but it’s also straddling the line in a way to try to appeal to more people while not going all hardcore."

See also

 A Wish of My Sister - previous hentai manga by the same author, which characters (Keisuke and his unnamed sister) are similar in appearance and actions with Sora and Aki

References

External links
 

2008 manga
2009 anime OVAs
2010 anime OVAs
Anime and manga controversies
Akita Shoten manga
Anime Works
Hentai anime and manga
Hoods Entertainment
Incest in anime and manga
Obscenity controversies in comics
Seinen manga